American singer-songwriter Nichole Nordeman has released five studio albums, one live album, four compilation albums, one extended play, one soundtrack album, eighteen singles, and three music videos. In 1998, after winning a contest sponsored by the Gospel Music Association, Nordeman was signed to Star Song Communications and Sparrow Records and began to work on her debut studio album, Wide Eyed. The album was released in September 1998 and entered the Billboard Christian Albums and Billboard Heatseekers Albums charts at number 16 and 29, respectively, both of which marked her chart debut. Wide Eyed spawned four singles, "To Know You," "Who You Are," "I Wish the Same", and "Wide Eyed", and has sold 130,000 copies in the United States. In May  2000, Nordeman released her second studio album, This Mystery, which charted on the Billboard Christian Albums chart at 12. Three singles, "This Mystery," "Fool For You" and "Every Season", were released from This Mystery. Nordeman's third studio album, Woven & Spun, was released in September 2002. The album entered the Billboard 200 chart at number 136 and at the Billboard Christian Albums chart at number five. All three of Woven & Spuns singles, "Holy", "Legacy", and "Even Then", became top forty hits on the Billboard Christian Songs chart. "Holy" spent 10 weeks at number one on the Christian AC radio charts. In May 2003, Nordeman released her first live album, Live at the Door, which was recorded at The Door music venue in Dallas, Texas. In May 2005, she released her fourth studio album, Brave. The album entered the Billboard 200 chart at number 119 and at the Billboard Christian Albums chart at number two, marking Nordeman's career highest charting debut. Its lead single and title track became her first Billboard number one hit on the Billboard Christian Songs chart, while its two succeeding singles, "What If" and "Real to Me", became top twenty hits on the chart.

In 2007, Nordeman released her first greatest hits album, Recollection: The Best of Nichole Nordeman before taking hiatus in her music career. The album's lead single, "Sunrise", charted within the top forty of the Billboard Christian Songs chart. In 2010, during her hiatus, Nordeman collaborated with Canadian record producer Bernie Herms to write and produce the concept soundtrack album, Music Inspired by The Story, which was released in September 2011. The album charted on the Billboard 200 and the Christian Albums charts at numbers 135 and 11, respectively. Its lead single, "I'm With You", a duet with recording artist Amy Grant, charted on the  Billboard Christian Songs chart at number 29. Between 2010–2013, Nordeman has released the singles, "Beautiful for Me", "Turn Your Eyes Upon Jesus (Look Up)", and "Real", before announcing intentions to release a record. In 2015, she released her first extended play, The Unmaking. According to the Capitol Christian Music Group, Nordeman has sold over one million records.

Albums

Studio albums

Live albums

Compilation albums

Soundtrack albums

Extended plays

Singles

Other charted songs

Other appearances

Music videos

References

External links 

Discographies of American artists
Christian music discographies